William F. Davis (October 3, 1921 – November 30, 1975) was an American professional basketball player. He played one season in the Basketball Association of America (BAA) with the Chicago Stags during the 1946–47 season. He attended the University of Notre Dame.

BAA career statistics

Regular season

Playoffs

References

External links
 

1921 births
1975 deaths
American men's basketball players
Chicago Stags players
Forwards (basketball)
Notre Dame Fighting Irish men's basketball players
Professional Basketball League of America players